Pavlyuchenko, Pavliuchenko, Pauliuchenka or Paŭliučenka, is a surname. Notable people with the surname include:

 Daria Pavliuchenko (born 2002), Russian pair skater
 Konstantin Pavlyuchenko (born 1971), Kazakhstani-Ukrainian footballer
 Pavel Pavlyuchenko (born 1998), Belarusian footballer
 Roman Pavlyuchenko (born 1981), Russian footballer

See also